Russell Hellman (1917-2004) was a Democratic member of the Michigan House of Representatives, representing the western end of the Upper Peninsula for two decades.

A lifelong resident of the Upper Peninsula, and of the same block in Dollar Bay, Michigan his entire life, Hellman bought a gas station when he was a senior in high school, and was elected township supervisor, for Osceola Township, at age 21. In 1960, he was elected to the Legislature where he served on the Appropriations Committee. Hellman was also instrumental in beginning the Great Lakes Coho Salmon program and a forestry program.

After he left office, Hellman started a consulting firm: the U.P. Lansing Associates about state and local issues.

References

1917 births
2004 deaths
People from Houghton County, Michigan
Democratic Party members of the Michigan House of Representatives
20th-century American politicians